Lokomotiv is a Russian rugby union club from Penza. It is the professional section of Imperia-Dynamo Penza, an amateur rugby club.

Club staff

Head coach – Alexander Yanyushkin 

Assistant coach – David Gurgenadze /

Strength & Conditioning coach – Maik Gehrmann 

Reserve team Head coach – Maksim Uskov 

Reserve team coach – Andrey Golischev 

Reserve team coach – Sergey Kolosov

Current squad

2022 Rugby Premier League

Record in European Games

Honours

Rugby 7 Russian Championship 
Champions: 2019, 2022.

Rugby Union Russian Championship 
Second place: 2019/

References

External links
 Official website 

Rugby clubs established in 2018
Russian rugby union teams
Sport in Penza